Walter Andonov (born January 5, 1969) is an American politician who served in the Nevada Assembly from the 21st district from 2002 to 2004.

References

1969 births
Living people
Republican Party members of the Nevada Assembly